Texas was admitted to the United States on December 29, 1845, and elects its U.S. senators to Class 1 and Class 2. The state's current senators are Republicans John Cornyn (serving since 2002) and Ted Cruz (serving since 2013). A total of 27 Democrats, 7 Republicans, and 1 Liberal Republican have served or are serving as U.S. senators from Texas. Morris Sheppard was Texas's longest-serving senator (1913–1941).

List of senators

|- style="height:2em"
| colspan=3 | Vacant
| nowrap | Dec 29, 1845 –Feb 21, 1846
| Texas did not elect its senators until two months after statehood.
| rowspan=4 | 1
| 
| rowspan=2 | 1
| Texas did not elect its senators until two months after statehood.
| nowrap | Dec 29, 1845 –Feb 21, 1846
| colspan=3 | Vacant

|-
! rowspan=7 | 1
| rowspan=7 align=left | Thomas Jefferson Rusk
| rowspan=7  | Democratic
| rowspan=7 nowrap | Feb 21, 1846 –Jul 29, 1857
| rowspan=3 | Elected in 1846.
| Elected in 1846.
| rowspan=11 nowrap | Feb 21, 1846 –Mar 3, 1859
| rowspan=11 |Democratic
| rowspan=11 align=right | Sam Houston
! rowspan=11 | 1

|- style="height:2em"
| 
| rowspan=3 | 2
| rowspan=3 | Re-elected in 1847.

|- style="height:2em"
| 

|- style="height:2em"
| rowspan=3 | Re-elected in 1851.
| rowspan=3 | 2
| 

|- style="height:2em"
| 
| rowspan=7 | 3
| rowspan=7 | Re-elected in 1853.Retired.

|- style="height:2em"
| 

|- style="height:2em"
| Re-elected in 1857.Died.
| rowspan=10 | 3
| 

|- style="height:2em"
| colspan=3 | Vacant
| nowrap | Jul 29, 1857 –Nov 9, 1857
|  

|- style="height:2em"
! 2
| align=left | James Pinckney Henderson
|  | Democratic
| nowrap | Nov 9, 1857 –Jun 4, 1858
| Appointed to finish Rusk's term.Died.

|- style="height:2em"
| colspan=3 | Vacant
| nowrap | Jun 4, 1858 –Sep 27, 1858
|  

|- style="height:2em"
! rowspan=2 | 3
| rowspan=2 align=left | Matthias Ward
| rowspan=2  | Democratic
| rowspan=2 nowrap | Sep 27, 1858 –Dec 5, 1859
| rowspan=2 | Appointed to continue Rusk's term.Lost nomination to finish Rusk's term.

|- style="height:2em"
| 
| rowspan=6 | 4
| rowspan=4 | Elected in 1859.Expelled following Texas's secession from the Union.
| rowspan=4 nowrap | Mar 4, 1859 –Jul 11, 1861
| rowspan=4 |Democratic
| rowspan=4 align=right | John Hemphill
! rowspan=4 | 2

|- style="height:2em"
! rowspan=2 | 4
| rowspan=2 align=left | Louis Wigfall
| rowspan=2  | Democratic
| rowspan=2 nowrap | Dec 5, 1859 –Mar 23, 1861
| rowspan=2 | Elected to finish Rusk's term.Withdrew.

|- style="height:2em"
| 

|- style="height:2em"
| rowspan=6 colspan=3 | Vacant
| rowspan=6 nowrap | Mar 23, 1861 –Mar 30, 1870
| rowspan=6 | Civil War and reconstruction.

|- style="height:2em"
| rowspan=6 | Civil War and reconstruction.
| rowspan=6 nowrap | Jul 11, 1861 –Mar 31, 1870
| rowspan=6 colspan=3 | Vacant

|- style="height:2em"
| rowspan=3 | 4
| 

|- style="height:2em"
| 
| rowspan=5 | 5

|- style="height:2em"
| 

|- style="height:2em"
| rowspan=5 | 5
| 

|- style="height:2em"
! rowspan=4 | 5
| rowspan=4 align=left | James W. Flanagan
| rowspan=4  | Republican
| rowspan=4 nowrap | Mar 30, 1870 –Mar 3, 1875
| rowspan=4 | Elected upon readmission.

|- style="height:2em"
| Elected upon readmission.
| rowspan=4 nowrap | Mar 31, 1870 –Mar 3, 1877
| rowspan=2 |Republican
| rowspan=4 align=right | Morgan C. Hamilton
! rowspan=4 | 3

|- style="height:2em"
| 
| rowspan=3 | 6
| rowspan=3 | Re-elected in 1871.Retired.

|- style="height:2em"
| 
|  | Liberal Republican

|- style="height:2em"
! rowspan=6 | 6
| rowspan=6 align=left | Samuel B. Maxey
| rowspan=6  | Democratic
| rowspan=6 nowrap | Mar 4, 1875 –Mar 3, 1887
| rowspan=3 | Elected in 1875.
| rowspan=3 | 6
| 
|  | Republican

|- style="height:2em"
| 
| rowspan=3 | 7
| rowspan=3 | Elected in 1876.
| rowspan=11 nowrap | Mar 4, 1877 –Mar 3, 1895
| rowspan=11 |Democratic
| rowspan=11 align=right | Richard Coke
! rowspan=11 | 4

|- style="height:2em"
| 

|- style="height:2em"
| rowspan=3 | Re-elected in 1881.Lost re-election.
| rowspan=3 | 7
| 

|- style="height:2em"
| 
| rowspan=3 | 8
| rowspan=3 | Re-elected in 1882.

|- style="height:2em"
| 

|- style="height:2em"
! rowspan=3 | 7
| rowspan=3 align=left | John H. Reagan
| rowspan=3  | Democratic
| rowspan=3 nowrap | Mar 4, 1887 –Jun 10, 1891
| rowspan=3 | Elected in 1887.Resigned to become chairman of the Railroad Commission of Texas.
| rowspan=5 | 8
| 

|- style="height:2em"
| 
| rowspan=5 | 9
| rowspan=5 | Re-elected in 1888.Retired.

|- style="height:2em"
| 

|- style="height:2em"
! 8
| align=left | Horace Chilton
|  | Democratic
| nowrap | Jun 10, 1891 –Mar 22, 1892
| Appointed to continue Reagan's term.Lost election to finish Reagan's term.

|- style="height:2em"
! rowspan=4 | 9
| rowspan=4 align=left | Roger Q. Mills
| rowspan=4  | Democratic
| rowspan=4 nowrap | Mar 23, 1892 –Mar 3, 1899
| Elected to finish Reagan's term.

|- style="height:2em"
| rowspan=3 | Re-elected in 1893.Retired.
| rowspan=3 | 9
| 

|- style="height:2em"
| 
| rowspan=3 | 10
| rowspan=3 | Elected in 1894.Retired.
| rowspan=3 nowrap | Mar 4, 1895 –Mar 3, 1901
| rowspan=3 |Democratic
| rowspan=3 align=right | Horace Chilton
! rowspan=3 | 5

|- style="height:2em"
| 

|- style="height:2em"
! rowspan=15 | 10
| rowspan=15 align=left | Charles Allen Culberson
| rowspan=15  | Democratic
| rowspan=15 nowrap | Mar 4, 1899 –Mar 3, 1923
| rowspan=3 | Elected in 1899.
| rowspan=3 | 10
| 

|- style="height:2em"
| 
| rowspan=3 | 11
| rowspan=3 | Elected in 1901.
| rowspan=6 nowrap | Mar 4, 1901 –Jan 3, 1913
| rowspan=6 |Democratic
| rowspan=6 align=right | Joseph Weldon Bailey
! rowspan=6 | 6

|- style="height:2em"
| 

|- style="height:2em"
| rowspan=3 | Re-elected in 1905.
| rowspan=3 | 11
| 

|- style="height:2em"
| 
| rowspan=6 | 12
| rowspan=3 | Re-elected in 1907.Resigned.

|- style="height:2em"
| 

|- style="height:2em"
| rowspan=6 | Re-elected in 1911.
| rowspan=6 | 12
| 

|- style="height:2em"
| Appointed to continue Bailey's term.Lost election to finish Bailey's term.Retired.
| nowrap | Jan 4, 1913 –Jan 29, 1913
| |Democratic
| align=right | Rienzi Melville Johnston
! 7

|- style="height:2em"
|  
| nowrap | Jan 29, 1913 –Feb 3, 1913
| colspan=3 | Vacant

|- style="height:2em"
| Elected in 1913 to finish Bailey's term.
| rowspan=16 nowrap | Feb 3, 1913 –Apr 9, 1941
| rowspan=16 |Democratic
| rowspan=16 align=right | Morris Sheppard
! rowspan=16 | 8

|- style="height:2em"
| 
| rowspan=3 | 13
| rowspan=3 | Elected in 1913 to the full term.

|- style="height:2em"
| 

|- style="height:2em"
| rowspan=3 | Re-elected in 1916.Lost re-election.
| rowspan=3 | 13
| 

|- style="height:2em"
| 
| rowspan=3 | 14
| rowspan=3 | Re-elected in 1918.

|- style="height:2em"
| 

|- style="height:2em"
! rowspan=3 | 11
| rowspan=3 align=left | Earle Bradford Mayfield
| rowspan=3  | Democratic
| rowspan=3 nowrap | Mar 4, 1923 –Mar 3, 1929
| rowspan=3 | Elected in 1922.Lost renomination.
| rowspan=3 | 14
| 

|- style="height:2em"
| 
| rowspan=3 | 15
| rowspan=3 | Re-elected in 1924.

|- style="height:2em"
| 

|- style="height:2em"
! rowspan=16 | 12
| rowspan=16 align=left | Tom Connally
| rowspan=16  | Democratic
| rowspan=16 nowrap | Mar 4, 1929 –Jan 3, 1953
| rowspan=3 | Elected in 1928.
| rowspan=3 | 15
| 

|- style="height:2em"
| 
| rowspan=3 | 16
| rowspan=3 | Re-elected in 1930.

|- style="height:2em"
| 

|- style="height:2em"
| rowspan=3 | Re-elected in 1934.
| rowspan=3 | 16
| 

|- style="height:2em"
| 
| rowspan=7 | 17
| rowspan=3 | Re-elected in 1936.Died.

|- style="height:2em"
| 

|- style="height:2em"
| rowspan=7 | Re-elected in 1940.
| rowspan=7 | 17
| 

|- style="height:2em"
|  
| nowrap | Apr 9, 1941 –Apr 21, 1941
| colspan=3 | Vacant

|- style="height:2em"
| Appointed to continue Sheppard's term.Died.
| nowrap | Apr 21, 1941 –Jun 26, 1941
| |Democratic
| align=right | Andrew Jackson Houston
! 9

|- style="height:2em"
|  
| nowrap | Jun 26, 1941 –Aug 4, 1941
| colspan=3 | Vacant

|- style="height:2em"
| Elected to finish Sheppard's term.
| rowspan=4 nowrap | Aug 4, 1941 –Jan 3, 1949
| rowspan=4 |Democratic
| rowspan=4 align=right | W. Lee O'Daniel
! rowspan=4 | 10

|- style="height:2em"
| 
| rowspan=3 | 18
| rowspan=3 | Re-elected in 1942.Retired.

|- style="height:2em"
| 

|- style="height:2em"
| rowspan=3 | Re-elected in 1946.Retired.
| rowspan=3 | 18
| 

|- style="height:2em"
| 
| rowspan=3 | 19
| rowspan=3 | Elected in 1948.
| rowspan=8 nowrap | Jan 3, 1949 –Jan 3, 1961
| rowspan=8 |Democratic
| rowspan=8 align=right | Lyndon B. Johnson
! rowspan=8 | 11

|- style="height:2em"
| 

|- style="height:2em"
! rowspan=3 | 13
| rowspan=3 align=left | Price Daniel
| rowspan=3  | Democratic
| rowspan=3 nowrap | Jan 3, 1953 –Jan 14, 1957
| rowspan=3 | Elected in 1952.Resigned to become Governor of Texas.
| rowspan=5 | 19
| 

|- style="height:2em"
| 
| rowspan=5 | 20
| rowspan=5 | Re-elected in 1954.Re-elected in 1960, but resigned to become U.S. Vice President.

|- style="height:2em"
| 

|- style="height:2em"
! 14
| align=left | William A. Blakley
|  | Democratic
| nowrap | Jan 15, 1957 –Apr 28, 1957
| Appointed to continue Daniel's term.Retired when his successor was elected.

|- style="height:2em"
! rowspan=8 | 15
| rowspan=8 align=left | Ralph Yarborough
| rowspan=8  | Democratic
| rowspan=8 nowrap | Apr 29, 1957 –Jan 3, 1971
| Elected to finish Daniel's term.

|- style="height:2em"
| rowspan=4 | Re-elected in 1958.
| rowspan=4 | 20
| 

|- style="height:2em"
| 
| rowspan=4 | 21
| Appointed to begin Johnson's term.Lost election to finish Johnson's term.
| nowrap | Jan 3, 1961 –Jun 14, 1961
| |Democratic
| align=right | William A. Blakley
! 12

|- style="height:2em"
| rowspan=3 | Elected May 27, 1961 to finish Johnson's term.
| rowspan=12 nowrap | Jun 15, 1961 –Jan 3, 1985
| rowspan=12 |Republican
| rowspan=12 align=right | John Tower
! rowspan=12 | 13

|- style="height:2em"
| 

|- style="height:2em"
| rowspan=3 | Re-elected in 1964.Lost renomination.
| rowspan=3 | 21
| 

|- style="height:2em"
| 
| rowspan=3 | 22
| rowspan=3 | Re-elected in 1966.

|- style="height:2em"
| 

|- style="height:2em"
! rowspan=12 | 16
| rowspan=12 align=left | Lloyd Bentsen
| rowspan=12  | Democratic
| rowspan=12 nowrap | Jan 3, 1971 –Jan 20, 1993
| rowspan=3 | Elected in 1970.
| rowspan=3 | 22
| 

|- style="height:2em"
| 
| rowspan=3 | 23
| rowspan=3 | Re-elected in 1972.

|- style="height:2em"
| 

|- style="height:2em"
| rowspan=3 | Re-elected in 1976.
| rowspan=3 | 23
| 

|- style="height:2em"
| 
| rowspan=3 | 24
| rowspan=3 | Re-elected in 1978.Retired.

|- style="height:2em"
| 

|- style="height:2em"
| rowspan=3 | Re-elected in 1982.
| rowspan=3 | 24
| 

|- style="height:2em"
| 
| rowspan=3 | 25
| rowspan=3 | Elected in 1984.
| rowspan=12 nowrap | Jan 3, 1985 –Nov 30, 2002
| rowspan=12 |Republican
| rowspan=12 align=right | Phil Gramm
! rowspan=12 | 14

|- style="height:2em"
| 

|- style="height:2em"
| rowspan=3 | Re-elected in 1988.Resigned to become U.S. Secretary of the Treasury.
| rowspan=6 | 25
| 

|- style="height:2em"
| 
| rowspan=6 | 26
| rowspan=6 | Re-elected in 1990.

|- style="height:2em"
| 

|- style="height:2em"
| colspan=3 | Vacant
| nowrap | Jan 20, 1993 –Jan 21, 1993
|  

|- style="height:2em"
! 17
| align=left | Bob Krueger
|  | Democratic
| nowrap | Jan 21, 1993 –Jun 14, 1993
| Appointed to continue Bentsen's term.Lost election to finish Bentsen's term.

|- style="height:2em"
! rowspan=12 | 18
| rowspan=12 align=left | Kay Bailey Hutchison
| rowspan=12  | Republican
| rowspan=12 nowrap | Jun 14, 1993 –Jan 3, 2013
| Elected in 1993 to finish Bentsen's term.

|- style="height:2em"
| rowspan=3 | Re-elected in 1994.
| rowspan=3 | 26
| 

|- style="height:2em"
| 
| rowspan=5 | 27
| rowspan=3 | Re-elected in 1996.Retired, and resigned early to give successor preferential seniority.

|- style="height:2em"
| 

|- style="height:2em"
| rowspan=5 | Re-elected in 2000.
| rowspan=5 | 27
| 

|- style="height:2em"
|  
| nowrap | Nov 30, 2002 –Dec 2, 2002
| colspan=3 | Vacant

|- style="height:2em"
| Appointed to finish Gramm's term, having been elected to the next term.
| rowspan=13 nowrap | Dec 2, 2002 –present
| rowspan=13 |Republican
| rowspan=13 align=right | John Cornyn
! rowspan=13 | 15

|- style="height:2em"
| 
| rowspan=3 | 28
| rowspan=3 | Elected in 2002.

|- style="height:2em"
| 

|- style="height:2em"
| rowspan=3 | Re-elected in 2006.Retired.
| rowspan=3 | 28
| 

|- style="height:2em"
| 
| rowspan=3 | 29
| rowspan=3 | Re-elected in 2008.

|- style="height:2em"
| 

|- style="height:2em"
! rowspan=6 | 19
| rowspan=6 align=left | Ted Cruz
| rowspan=6  | Republican
| rowspan=6 nowrap | Jan 3, 2013 –present
| rowspan=3 | Elected in 2012.
| rowspan=3 | 29
| 

|- style="height:2em"
| 
| rowspan=3 | 30
| rowspan=3 | Re-elected in 2014.

|- style="height:2em"
| 

|- style="height:2em"
| rowspan=3 | Re-elected in 2018.
| rowspan=3 | 30
| 

|- style="height:2em"
| 
| rowspan=3| 31
| rowspan=3  | Re-elected in 2020.

|- style="height:2em"
| 

|- style="height:2em"
| rowspan=2 colspan=5 | To be determined in the 2024 election.
| rowspan=2 |31
| 

|- style="height:2em"
| 
| 32
| colspan=5 | To be determined in the 2026 election.

See also

 United States congressional delegations from Texas
 List of United States representatives from Texas
 Elections in Texas

References

 
Texas
United States Senators by state